Jodia Bazaar is a bazaar located in Karachi, Pakistan. The bazaar comprises a wholesale market for commodities including flour, wheat, rice, sugar, and legumes.

Jodia Bazaar is also known as the main market of hand fans in Pakistan.

History
Jodia Bazaar was established in 1947 after independence.

Shops
Some of the largest sugar merchants of Pakistan are based in Jodia Bazaar. Some of the shops are owned by emigrants from India.

Tapal Tea, one of the largest Tea company in Pakistan, started its business with a small shop in Jodia Bazaar.

References

Bazaars in Karachi
Tourist attractions in Karachi